Corbera is a municipality in the comarca of Ribera Baixa in the Valencian Community, Spain.

References

Municipalities in the Province of Valencia
Ribera Baixa